The 2013–14 Eerste Divisie, known as Jupiler League for sponsorship reasons, was the fifty-eight season of Eerste Divisie since its establishment in 1955. It began on 2 August 2013 with the first matches of the season and ended on 26 May 2014 with the return of the finals of the promotion/relegation play-offs, also involving the 16th- and 17th-placed teams from the 2013–14 Eredivisie.

Teams
A total of 20 teams took part in the league. SC Cambuur were promoted from the Eerste Divisie as 2012–13 champions and replaced by bottom-placed Eredivisie Willem II, whereas Go Ahead Eagles won a top flight place in the nacompetitie, replacing VVV-Venlo, who were eliminated from the post-season playoff and therefore relegated to Eerste Divisie for this season. Following the bankruptcy of SC Veendam and AGOVV in 2012-13 and RBC and HFC Haarlem in previous seasons, four teams were added to bring the division back up to 20 teams. Achilles '29 were promoted from the Topklasse with the reserve teams of Ajax, FC Twente and PSV being added as well. Topklasse champion Katwijk declined promotion. The reserve teams were not eligible for promotion or play-off participation.

League table

Eredivisie play-offs
Ten teams play for two spots in the 2014–15 Eredivisie. Four teams from the 2013–14 Eerste Divisie enter in the first round, another four and the teams ranked 16th and 17th in the 2013–14 Eredivisie enter in the second round. Both winners of the third round, FC Dordrecht and Excelsior, play in the 2014–15 Eredivisie. 

Key: * = Play-off winners, a = Wins because of away goals rule, e = Wins after extra time in second leg, p = Wins after penalty shoot-out.

First round

Match A

Match B

Second round

Match C

Match D

Match E

Match F

Third round

Match G

Match H

References

External links
 

Eerste Divisie seasons
Neth
2